Gabriel Billington is an English professional footballer who plays as a midfielder for  club Exeter City.

Career
Billington made his senior debut for Exeter City on 4 October 2022, after coming on as a 61st-minute substitute for Alex Hartridge in a 2–1 win over Southampton U21 at St James Park in the group stages of the EFL Trophy.

Career statistics

References

Living people
English footballers
Association football midfielders
Exeter City F.C. players
Year of birth missing (living people)